Manniella is a genus of orchids (family Orchidaceae) belonging to the subfamily Orchidoideae.

It consists of two species: the type species Manniella gustavi Rchb.f.  and Manniella cypripedioides, Salazar & al., both from West Africa. Because of its phylogenetic position as the sister of Neotropical subtribes Cranichidinae s.l. and Spiranthinae, its status as the sole genus in the subtribe Manniellineae is justified on evolutionary grounds.

The genus is named after Gustav Mann

References

 Garay, L.A. Bot. Mus. Leafl. 28:333,1980
 Salazar, G.A., T. Franke, L. Zapfack and L. Beenken. 2002. A new species of Manniella (Orchidaceae, Cranichideae) from western tropical Africa, with notes on protandry in the genus. Lindleyana 17: 239–276.
 Salazar, G.A., M.W. Chase, M.A. Soto Arenas and M. Ingrouille. 2003. Phylogenetics of Cranichideae with emphasis on Spiranthinae (Orchidaceae, Orchidoideae): evidence from plastid and nuclear DNA sequences. American Journal of Botany 90: 777–795.

 
Cranichideae genera
Taxonomy articles created by Polbot